This Is Where I Belong – The Songs of Ray Davies & The Kinks is a compilation album, a tribute to the Kinks by various artists, published in 2002 by Praxis Recordings and manufactured and marketed by Rykodisc (Rykodisc RCD 10621). The executive producer is Jim Pitt; the associate producers include Jack Emerson, Andy McLenon, and Brad Hunt.

Fountains of Wayne covered the song "Better Things" on Late Night with Conan O'Brien ten days after the 9/11 terrorist attacks. That version of the song is included on this compilation.

Track listing
"Better Things" by Fountains of Wayne – 3:08
"Starstruck" by Steve Forbert – 3:29
"Stop Your Sobbing" by Jonathan Richman – 2:17
"No Return" by Bebel Gilberto – 4:08
"A Well Respected Man" by Josh Rouse – 3:13
"Victoria" by Cracker – 3:32
"Who'll Be the Next in Line" by Queens of the Stone Age – 2:28
"Big Sky" by Matthew Sweet – 2:50
"Art Lover" by Lambchop – 5:04
"Picture Book" by Bill Lloyd and Tommy Womack – 2:46
"Muswell Hillbilly" by Tim O'Brien – 3:54
"Get Back in Line" by The Minus 5 – 3:05
"'Till the End of the Day" by Fastball – 2:21
"This Is Where I Belong" by Ron Sexsmith – 2:19
"Fancy" by Yo La Tengo – 2:50
"Waterloo Sunset" by Ray Davies and Damon Albarn – 2:39

References

2002 compilation albums
The Kinks tribute albums